Northeast Airlines Flight 823 was a scheduled flight from New York City's LaGuardia Airport to Miami International Airport, Florida, which crashed shortly after takeoff on February 1, 1957. The aircraft operating the service was a Douglas DC-6 four-engined propeller airliner, registration  which entered service in 1955.

Accident sequence
While originally scheduled to depart at 2:45pm, delays due to snowfall pushed departure back to 6:01pm. Despite some sliding of the nosewheel on snow-covered pavement, the airplane was cleared to take off via runway 04 (040° magnetic heading), departing to the northeast of the field.

After what was described as a normal takeoff roll, the aircraft lifted off. Upon establishing a positive rate of climb, the landing gear and wing flaps were retracted, and the engine power was reduced to the maximum except for takeoff (METO) setting. The aircraft was now gaining altitude, flying on instruments without outside visibility as it headed over Flushing Bay. While the aircraft's clearance instructed that it proceed northeast on a heading of 40° (runway heading), the airplane began a gradual turn to the left. When it had reached a heading of 285° (nearly due west), it overflew Rikers Island. Its altitude was insufficient to clear the trees on the island, and the aircraft crashed, coming to rest within  of the point of first impact. The duration of the flight from takeoff to crash was approximately 60 seconds. The crash resulted in 20 fatalities and 78 injuries among the passengers and several injuries but no fatalities among the crew.

Recovery
Shortly after the crash, Rikers Island department personnel and prison trusties (inmates whose good behavior had earned the guards' trust) alike ran to the crash in order to help survivors. As a result of their actions, of the 57 inmates who assisted with the rescue effort, 30 were released and 16 received a reduction of six months by the N.Y.C. Parole Board. Governor W. Averell Harriman also granted commutation of sentence to 11 men serving definite sentences: two received a six months reduction; one workhouse and eight penitentiary definites became eligible for immediate release.

Investigation
An investigation by the Civil Aeronautics Board was hampered by a lack of information about what transpired aboard the aircraft in its final minute, as flight data and cockpit voice recorders had not yet been routinely installed in commercial aircraft. The Board found that the probable cause of the accident was "The failure of the captain to: 1) properly observe and interpret his flight instruments, and 2) maintain control of his aircraft." In layman's terms, the captain lost spatial awareness when he entered the clouds seconds after takeoff, and therefore didn't detect or correct the airplane's deviation from its desired course.

In popular culture
The flight was the featured story in a book on aviation written by Alvin Moscow, Tiger on a Leash. Told from the hindsight of 1961, it discussed many aspects of passenger flight of the time.

See also 
 List of accidents and incidents involving commercial aircraft

References

External links 
 Aircraft Accident Report on Flight 823 - Civil Aeronautics Board  - PDF - Alternate URL
 Pictures of crash from PlaneCrashInfo.com.
 NY Corrections History Society website dedicated to the crash of Flight 823 (very comprehensive source)

Airliner accidents and incidents involving controlled flight into terrain
Aviation accidents and incidents in the United States in 1957
1957 in New York City
Accidents and incidents involving the Douglas DC-6
Northeast Airlines accidents and incidents
Airliner accidents and incidents in New York City
1950s in Queens
February 1957 events in the United States
LaGuardia Airport